USS Lockwood (FF-1064) was the 13th  destroyer escort, redesignated a frigate in 1975. She was named for Charles A. Lockwood.

Design and description
The Knox-class design was derived from the  modified to extend range and without a long-range missile system. They displaced  at full load. Their crew consisted of 13 officers and 211 enlisted men.

The ships were equipped with one Westinghouse geared steam turbine that drove the single propeller shaft.

The Knox-class ships were armed with a 5"/54 caliber Mark 42 gun forward and a single 3-inch/50-caliber gun aft. They mounted an eight-round RUR-5 ASROC launcher between the 5-inch (127 mm) gun and the bridge. Close-range anti-submarine defense was provided by two twin  Mk 32 torpedo tubes. The ships were equipped with a torpedo-carrying DASH drone helicopter; its telescoping hangar and landing pad were positioned amidships aft of the mack. Beginning in the 1970s, the DASH was replaced by a SH-2 Seasprite LAMPS I helicopter and the hangar and landing deck were accordingly enlarged. Most ships also had the 3-inch (76 mm) gun replaced by an eight-cell BPDMS missile launcher in the early 1970s.

Construction and career 
She was constructed by Todd Pacific Shipyards, Seattle, Washington, laid down 3 November 1967, launched 5 September 1968 and delivered 1 December 1970. Lockwood was commissioned 5 December 1970 as destroyer escort (DE-1064).

In May 1975 USS Lockwood was reassigned to forward deployed Destroyer Squadron 15, changing her homeport to Yokosuka, Japan to be part of the  battle group. On 30 June 1975 USS Lockwood was reclassified as a frigate (FF-1064).

From 27 September -  21 December 1977 USS Lockwood sailed with the Midway battle group. during the cruise USS Lockwood visited ports, including Karachi, Pakistan, Singapore, and Bunbury, Western Australia.

On 1 November 1978 USS Lockwood, along with her sister ship  and oiler  arrived in Perth/Fremantle, Western Australia, for an R&R visit. They departed on 11 November.

From 24 February to 5 June 1981 USS Lockwood sailed with the Midway battle group. during the cruise USS Lockwood again visited Bunbury, Western Australia, from 6–11 May 1981.

In July 1988, USS Lockwood changed home port to Naval Station Long Beach, California, where she would remain until her decommissioning on 30 September 1993, struck from the NVR after 22.8 years of service

A contract was awarded on 29 September 1999 for $3.7 million to the Ship Dismantling & Recycling Joint Venture, San Francisco, California for towing/scrapping and the vessel was disposed of by recycling on 4 August 2000.

Its bell currently resides with VAQ-209 which is currently on display in Hangar 11, Naval Air Station Whidbey Island in Washington state.

Notes

References

External links
 
 NavSource
 Navysite.de
 NAVSEA U.S. Navy ship Disposal Project Update 14 Nov 2000
 Article describing the USS Lockwood departing Yokosuka, JN for new homeport

 

Ships built in Seattle
Knox-class frigates
1968 ships
Cold War frigates and destroyer escorts of the United States